Orry-la-Ville is a commune in the Oise department in northern France. Orry-la-Ville-Coye station has rail connections to Amiens, Creil, Compiègne and Paris.

See also
 Communes of the Oise department

Gallery

References

Communes of Oise